Wheeleria elbursi is a moth of the family Pterophoridae. It is found in Iran (including the Elburs Mountains) and Tukey.

The wings, head, thorax and abdomen are dirty white.

References

Moths described in 1981
Pterophorini
Moths of Asia
Moths of the Middle East